The official Oklahoma state meal is a state emblem of Oklahoma. While many U.S. states have one or more official foods, it is the only official state meal.

Creation
The meal was established by the 41st Oklahoma Legislature through House Concurrent Resolution 1983 in 1988. The menu selection process included input from the Oklahoma Department of Agriculture, the Oklahoma Restaurant Association, the Oklahoma Pork Council, the Oklahoma Beef Commission, the Oklahoma Wheat Commission, and some food-processing companies. April 19, 1988 was "Oklahoma Meal Day", and restaurants were encouraged to offer the meal.

Menu
The dishes are typical of Southern cuisine. Menu items include historic staple foods of the region and represent state agricultural production.

Meat
 Barbecued pork
 Chicken-fried steak
 Sausage with biscuits and gravy

Vegetable
 Black-eyed peas
 Corn
 Fried okra
 Grits
 Squash

Bread
 Cornbread

Dessert
 Pecan pie
 Strawberries

Criticism
Depending on portion sizes, the entire meal might contain 2,700 calories, 125 g fat, and 5,250 mg sodium, all in excess of a day's recommended intake. State Senator Brian Crain proposed a concurrent resolution which would repeal the meal. It did not pass and was only intended as a symbolic measure.

References

Cuisine of the Southern United States
Meals
Symbols of Oklahoma